Pomeroy is a small village and civil parish in County Tyrone, Northern Ireland. The 2011 Census recorded a population of 788 people.

Pomeroy is atop a large hill that dominates the surrounding countryside. From the Cookstown end, the road through the village gradually climbs a gradient up to a village square, The Diamond. The village is surrounded by the Pomeroy Hills. The surrounding countryside is a mixture of moorland and bog land. Stone age and Bronze Age cairns dot the landscape. Pomeroy is the closest settlement to the geographical centre of Ulster.

History

At the end of the 17th century there was no village in this area, just an extensive forest. In the plantation of Ulster James I and VI granted eight townlands to Sir William Parsons, Surveyor General of Ireland. In 1729 James Lowry inherited the land from his father, Robert of Aghenis Caledon.

In the 18th century two new parishes were created in Tyrone, and the same family, the Lowrys (from whom issued the Earls of Belmore), was involved in the establishment of both. Pomeroy was created from part of Donaghmore, while Clogherny was taken from Termonmaguirc. The arrangement was confirmed in 1731 by an Order in Council, which had the same legal status as an Act of Parliament, and the articles of agreement under which it was conducted by the two parties involved, Lord Tyrone and Robert Lowry, suggest the tone:
The name of each of the new erected parishes shall be wrote on a separate scrole of parchment, roll'd up and put into a hatt, to be held by an indeffernet person,... and that the said Marcus, Lord Viscount of Tyrone, and Robert Lowry shall each put his hand into the said hatt, and take thereout one of the said scroles, and that the advowson of that parish which shall be mentioned in the said scrole .. to be drawn out of the said hatte, by the said Lord Tyrone, shall stand and be the advowson of the said .. Tyrone, his heirs and assigns, for ever."

In 1750 Rev. James Lowry was granted the right to hold a weekly market in Pomeroy and an important event was the twice yearly Hiring Fair, held in May and November. Men and women from the surrounding countryside would gather at the fair and hire themselves out as farm workers and servants. In the 1640s the large forest had been stripped of timber and for many years after remained neglected. The Lowry family played a big part in the life of the area for about 200 years.

In the square is the Church of Ireland church which dates from the early 1840s. Its belfry and tower were paid for by the Lowry family as a token of their esteem for Pomeroy.

Much of the woodland is gone and the Georgian mansion demolished. All that remains is the family burial vault on Tanderagee Road. This was once approached by the longest avenue of Chilean pine trees in Ireland.

The road leading from Pomeroy to Donaghmore is known as the Royal Road because in 1689 James II and VII took this route to visit his troops in Derry during the historic siege. This route brought him through Cappagh and Altmore. King James's Well is by the roadside just outside Cappagh.

Transport
The Portadown, Dungannon and Omagh Junction Railway opened Pomeroy railway station on 2 September 1861. From 1876 until 1958 it was part of the Great Northern Railway. The Ulster Transport Authority closed the station and the PD&O line on 15 February 1965. Throughout its history it had the highest altitude of any Irish gauge railway station in Ireland.

Economy
Pomeroy is the home of a farm shop at Cloughbane Farm, which uses locally sourced meat, vegetables, potatoes, milk and flour in its products. The 180-acre farm is a fourth-generation, family-run beef and lamb farm outside Dungannon. The on-site farm shop and butchers were established in 2003 and in 2006 began selling home-cooked pies and take-away meals. In 2006 the company, which has won five UK Great Taste Awards, expanded after securing a supply deal with Tesco.

Demography

2011 Census
On Census Day (27 March 2011) the usually resident population of Pomeroy Settlement was 788 accounting for 0.04% of the NI total. In Pomeroy Settlement, considering the resident population:
 
99.49% were from the white (including Irish Traveller) ethnic group
89.34% belong to or were brought up in the Catholic religion and 9.26% belong to or were brought up in a 'Protestant and Other Christian (including Christian related)' religion
11.17% indicated that they had a British national identity, 55.58% had an Irish national identity and 30.58% had a Northern Irish national identity*.
26.68% had some knowledge of Irish
2.39% had some knowledge of Ulster-Scots
8.92% did not have English as their first language

Sport
Pomeroy Plunketts is the local Gaelic Athletic Association club.

Places of interest
 There is a modern forestry school on the estate of the Rev. James Lowry, the 18th century planner of the village.
 Mountains of Pomeroy
 Carrickmore
 Altmore
 Gortavoy Bridge
 Cavanakeeran

Demography
On Census Day (27 March 2011) the usually resident population of Pomeroy Settlement was 788, accounting for 0.04% of the NI total. Of these:
 21.7% were aged under 16 years and 10.66% were aged 65 and over
 48.1% of the population were male and 51.9% were female
 89.34% were from a Catholic background and 9.26% were from a 'Protestant and Other Christian (including Christian related)' background

People
 Andrea Begley, winner of BBC's The Voice in June 2013.
 Philomena Begley, Irish country music singer
 Liam Kelly, Irish republican politician and activist
 Kieran McGeary, Gaelic footballer

See also
List of civil parishes of County Tyrone

References

Links
 Parish of Pomeroy

Villages in County Tyrone
Civil parishes of County Tyrone